This is a list of North Alabama Lions football players in the NFL Draft.

Key

Selections

References

North Alabama

North Alabama Lions NFL Draft